For Those About to Rock: Monsters in Moscow  is a 1992 film featuring live performances by rock and heavy metal bands AC/DC, Metallica, The Black Crowes, Pantera, and E.S.T. in the Tushino Airfield in Moscow, during the dissolution of the Soviet Union.

In September 1991, only a month after the August Putsch failed, 1.6 million rock music fans converged in Moscow to enjoy the first open-air rock concert, as part of the Monsters of Rock series. For Those About to Rock: Monsters in Moscow also offers a look at the efforts of the Soviet Army to try to postpone the concert (not on the original VHS release).
The versions of "Whole Lotta Rosie" and "The Jack" that AC/DC performed at this concert were released on two of AC/DC's live albums, AC/DC Live and AC/DC Live: 2 CD Collector's Edition.

Track listing
Pantera
"Cowboys from Hell" (Anselmo, D. Abbott, V. Abbott, Brown)
"Primal Concrete Sledge" (Anselmo, D. Abbott, V. Abbott, Brown)
"Psycho Holiday" (Anselmo, D. Abbott, V. Abbott, Brown)

E.S.T.
"Bully"

The Black Crowes
"Stare It Cold" (Robinson, Robinson, Cease, Colt, Gorman)
"Rainy Day Women#12 & 35" (Dylan)

Metallica
 "Enter Sandman" (Hammett, Hetfield, Ulrich)
"Creeping Death" (Hetfield, Ulrich, Burton, Hammett)
"Fade to Black" (Hetfield, Ulrich, Burton, Hammett)
"Harvester of Sorrow" (Hetfield, Ulrich)

AC/DC
"Back in Black" (Young, Young, Johnson)
"Highway to Hell" (Young, Young, Scott)
"Whole Lotta Rosie" (Young, Young, Scott)
"For Those About to Rock (We Salute You)" (Young, Young, Johnson)

References

External links

1990s English-language films
1992 films
AC/DC
Concert films
Dissolution of the Soviet Union
Documentary films about heavy metal music and musicians
Documentary films about music festivals
Films shot in Moscow
Metallica
Music in Moscow
Pantera
The Black Crowes